Alan Marangoni (born 16 July 1984) is an Italian former professional road racing cyclist, who rode professionally between 2009 and 2018 for the , ,  and  teams.

Personal
Born on 16 July 1984, in Lugo, Emilia-Romagna, Marangoni resides in Cotignola, Emilia-Romagna, Italy.

Career

In October 2018, Marangoni confirmed that he would be retiring from competition, and that he would take up a role working in television. He now works as a presenter for the Global Cycling Network.

Major results
Sources:

2006
 1st  Time trial, National Under-23 Road Championships
2008
 1st Stage 5 Giro della Regione Friuli Venezia Giulia
 2nd Memorial Davide Fardelli
 10th Coppa della Pace
2011
 3rd Time trial, National Road Championships
 10th Overall Tour de Luxembourg
2012
 6th Time trial, National Road Championships
2013
 7th Time trial, National Road Championships
2014
 3rd Time trial, National Road Championships
 9th Team time trial, UCI Road World Championships
2015
 4th Time trial, National Road Championships
2016
 1st Stage 1 (TTT) Czech Cycling Tour
 9th Time trial, National Road Championships
 2017
 3rd Overall Tour of Thailand
2018
 1st Tour de Okinawa

Grand Tour general classification results timeline

References

External links

Cycling Base: Alan Marangoni
Cycling Quotient: Alan Marangoni

Cannondale-Garmin: Alan Marangoni

1984 births
Living people
Italian male cyclists
People from Lugo, Emilia-Romagna
Cyclists from Emilia-Romagna
Sportspeople from the Province of Ravenna